Georg Friedrich (born 31 October 1966) is an Austrian actor. He appeared in more than eighty films since 1984. In 2017 he played in the German movie Wild by Nicolette Krebitz. He won the Silver Bear for Best Actor at the 2017 Berlin Film Festival for his performance in the film Bright Nights.

Selected filmography

References

External links 

1966 births
Living people
Austrian male film actors
Silver Bear for Best Actor winners

Male actors from Vienna